The India men's national squash team represents India in international squash team competitions, and is governed by Squash Rackets Federation of India.

Since 1967, India has participated in three quarter finals of the World Squash Team Open.

Current team
 Saurav Ghosal
 Ramit Tandon
 Velavan Senthilkumar
 Abhay Singh
 Mahesh Mangaonkar

Results

World Team Squash Championships

Asian Squash Team Championships

See also 
Squash in India
Squash Rackets Federation of India
 India women's national squash team

References

External links 
 Team India

Squash teams
Men's national squash teams
Squash
Squash in India
Men's sport in India